Berrisford is a surname. Notable people with the surname include:

Judith Berrisford (born 1912), British author
Simon Berrisford (born 1963), British rower

See also
Berisford
Berresford